International Artists (IA) was an American independent record label based in Houston, Texas, United States, that originally existed from 1965 to 1970.  It is not to be confused with International Artists Records, a classical music record label founded in New York City in 1956.

During its existence IA, owned by a group of businessmen in Houston, released 12 albums and 39 singles.  Among its staff was producer Lelan Rogers, brother of country singer Kenny Rogers.  The label is famous for its roster of well-known Texas psychedelic rock bands, including The 13th Floor Elevators, The Red Crayola, and Bubble Puppy, as well as lesser known bands such as The Golden Dawn, Lost And Found, and Endle St. Cloud.  International Artists also released an album by blues guitarist Lightnin' Hopkins, Free Form Patterns, that featured session work by the 13th Floor Elevators' rhythm section. International Artist was based out of Goldstar Studios which is now known as SugarHill Studios in Houston,TX. SugarHills Studios is still in operation.

The label originally folded in 1971 but was revived by Lelan Rogers in 1978.  Rogers released a box-set of all 12 reissued albums.  In 1980 the double-LP Epitaph for a Legend (IA #13) reissued rare International Artists tracks from Roky Erickson's first band, The Spades; early demos by the Red Crayola; and forgotten relics from other Texas blues and psychedelic artists.  A six-CD box set, The Best of International Artists, was released in 2003 and included the entire Epitaph compilation, along with reissues of the debut albums by the Thirteenth Floor Elevators, Red Krayola, Lost & Found, and Bubble Puppy.

In 2008, now under the control of Charly Records, the label began to re-issue all of its past albums, together with some rarities and previously unheard recordings, including a 10-CD box set dedicated solely to the 13th Floor Elevators.

See also
 List of record labels

References

External links
The Official International Artists Records web site
The International Artists label Story and discography by Patrick Lundborg, 2008

American independent record labels
Record labels established in 1965
Record labels disestablished in 1970
Psychedelic rock record labels
Companies based in Houston